{{DISPLAYTITLE:C14H8O2}}
The molecular formula C14H8O2 (molar mass: 208.216 g/mol)
may refer to:

 Anthraquinone, also known as anthracenedione or dioxoanthracene
 Phenanthrenequinone

Molecular formulas